Paradise PD is an American adult animated sitcom created by Waco O'Guin and Roger Black that premiered on August 31, 2018, on Netflix. The series stars Dana Snyder, Cedric Yarbrough, David Herman, Tom Kenny, Sarah Chalke, and Kyle Kinane. The second season was released on March 6, 2020, and the third season was released on March 12, 2021. Netflix renewed the series for the fourth and final season, titled Paradise PD: Party Dudes, which premiered on December 16, 2022.

Premise
Paradise PD follows Kevin Crawford joining the small-town police department in the crime-ridden town of Paradise with his mother Karen as the mayor, his estranged father Chief Randall Crawford initially against his son joining the force as he blamed him for his numerous shortcomings since Kevin accidentally shooting his testicles. The other police officers themselves are equally incompetent and morally corrupt, consisting of the violent Gina Jabowski, the PTSD-afflicted Gerald "Fritz" Fitzgerald, morally-obese man-child Dusty Marlow, perverted senior citizen Stantley Hopson, and drug-addict drug dog Bullet. The town is also home to many weird regulars that include the hillbillies Robby and Delbert, Hobo Cop, Dr. Funtlicher, Preacher Paul, Frank Flipperfist and his son Jerry.

The overarching storyline of the first two seasons focuses on Kevin trying to earn his father's love by cracking down on a crime boss known only as "The Kingpin", eventually revealed to be an alternate personality of Fitz's whose master scheme is turning Paradise into a giant deep-dish pizza. The third season covers a series of events that include Kevin entering into a relationship with Gina despite her fat man fetish and violent streak, Randall and Karen rekindling their relationship with the latter pregnant, and Fitz and Bullet in a relationship with a dolphin before raising the latter's biological dog/dolphin hybrid son together. But Gina runs off on her wedding day with the police force fired after another disaster strikes Paradise. The fourth and final season depicts the former officers ending up in a series of events from Kevin's newborn baby brother trying to have him killed to a eccentric CEO named Charles Lovely moving to Paradise with sinister plans in mind.

Cast and characters

Main

 Sarah Chalke (main; seasons 1–3) and Donna Jay Fulks (recurring; season 4) as Gina Jabowski, a psychotic and violent police officer who is the most feared enforcer in the town of Paradise. As a fat fetishist, she is obsessed with and often sexually harasses her obese coworker Dusty Marlow, much to his mild disdain. When she was a little girl, her father made her a human shield to block a bullet shot from Randall and got hit in the back of her head. She survived the shot with the bullet still inside her skull, which was revealed to be the cause of her being a hot-tempered violent psychopath and an obese-loving harasser. Over the course of the series, she and Kevin slowly fall in love leading her to surgically remove the bullet in her brain so she can be faithful to him. During their wedding, Isis attacks and takes everyone hostage, forcing Kevin to shoot her in the head to return her to her angry persona, much to their shared sadness. Following the season three finale, Gina ends up working with the Strawberry Action Squad to infiltrate Lovely Corp. She is the PD counterpart of Brickleberry main cast member Ethel Anderson.
 David Herman as Kevin Crawford, a newly hired police officer and the son of Chief Randall Crawford and Mayor Karen Crawford. Initially as dim witted and incompetent as the others, as the series progresses, it is shown he is actually a capable and competent officer, though he could be better if he had the proper equipment and funding for his work. Kevin has faced constant abuse from his parents after he accidentally shot his father's testicles thirteen years prior to the beginning of the series. In seasons two and three, Kevin developed a crush on Gina when she began to soften towards him. While these feelings were initially unrequited, they eventually entered into a relationship, and became engaged near the end of season three. He is left heartbroken when she leaves him in remorse for nearly killing him on their wedding day after reverting back into her violent persona following an Isis attack. Following the birth of his baby brother, he is renamed  "AFKAK" (An acronym for "Asshole Formerly Known as Kevin") before eventually asserting himself to finally be respected. He is the PD counterpart of Brickleberry main cast member Steve Williams.
 Tom Kenny as Chief Randall Crawford, the police chief of Paradise PD and Kevin's father. Once a fine and proud cop, following an incident where his son shot off both of his testicles, he became incredibly bitter, which eventually led to his divorce with his wife. He has frequently been seen to use testosterone patches in order to maintain his hormone levels. Throughout season one he reignites his relationship with Mayor Karen, and they get remarried in season two. He is the PD counterpart of Brickleberry main cast member Woody Johnson, the two revealed to be estranged cousins.
 Kyle Kinane as Bullet, an anthropomorphic police dog who is addicted to the confiscated drugs that he is tasked with guarding. He is the PD counterpart of Brickleberry main cast member Malloy.
 Cedric Yarbrough as Gerald "Fitz" Fitzgerald, a police officer whose PTSD sometimes hinders his police work. He has been shown to cope through therapeutic piccolo playing. He often struggles to have his troubles understood by the other officers, leading to discourse within the team, especially in the second season. In the season one finale, it revealed that Fitz was the mysterious Kingpin but in the season two finale, Fitz's kingpin persona is actually a split personality that is based from the original Kingpin, who was an overweight criminal that has an obsession with Deep Dish Pizza and took over Fitz's body to continue his crime empire. In the season two finale, Fitz defeats the Kingpin persona in his mind and takes control of his body again. He is the PD counterpart of Brickleberry main cast member Denzel Jackson.
 Dana Snyder as Dusty Marlow (seasons 2–4; recurring season 1), an obese police officer who is constantly sexually harassed by Gina. He is very childlike and owns several cats. He has been shown to hold a grudge with everyone who laughs at him when he ripped his pants every time he bends over and yells at employees of fast food restaurants for giving him meals that are impossible to be ordered. In season three, he acts as a manipulative bully who harasses food store owners in Restaurant Road and blackmails his coworkers to get whatever he wants. It is possible that these changes in his personality would be the result of his time at the female prison in the season one finale and season two premiere. He is the PD counterpart of Brickleberry main cast member Connie Cunaman.
 Snyder also voices Stanley Hopson (seasons 2–4; recurring season 1), an elderly bisexual police officer who often gets out-of-the-ordinary assignments from Chief Crawford. Even at his advanced age, Hopson is a sexually active deviant, who often recounts his sexual endeavors with other men. He is also senile, which leads to many comical misunderstandings. In the pilot episode, Randall reveals that they cannot retire Stanley because the city lacks the funds to pay his pension. He is the only main cast member to not have a Brickleberry counterpart, implying that he is naturally a Paradise PD character (or a standalone), while the other 6 are cop versions of the Brickleberry main cast (rangers).
 Synder also voices Baby Kevin Crawford, who was previously voiced by Rocky Russo in season 3. First appearing in the third season as a fetus that was originally a 15-year old sperm cell, he attempted to kill Randall out of revenge as his surviving sperm cell before being informed that Kevin is the guilty party. The baby is later born at the beginning for the final season, named "Kevin" by his parents as their way of starting fresh as parents and revealed to be immortal. Baby Kevin spends most of the final season trying to force Kevin to kill himself, only to make peace with his brother after his time travel adventure. Like Bullet, he is the PD counterpart of Brickleberry main cast member Malloy.

Recurring
 Grey Griffin as Mayor Karen Crawford, the mayor of Paradise, Kevin's mother, and Randall's ex-wife.
 Waco O'Guin as Robbie, a blonde redneck who sells argyle meth. Bears a striking resemblance to Brickleberry character, Bobby Possumcods. Which in the Season 2 announcement video, revealed that Bobby and Robbie are related cousins.
 Roger Black as Delbert, Robbie's adoptive brother, best friend and sidekick who also sells argyle meth. Also bears a striking resemblance to a Brickleberry character. In this case, it's BoDean (Bobby Possumcods' dim-witted friend). In the season one episode Task Force, Delbert gets attacked by the Kingpin's goons due to a decline in argyle meth sales and loses his right arm in the process; by the end of the first season, he gains a robotic prosthetic. In the season two episode Who Ate Wally's Waffles, it is revealed that Delbert's birth name was Wally and he was artificially created by imagineers at The Walt Disney Company to be their next Disney star; he is stolen by Robbie's family as a kid, renamed Delbert, and de facto adopted by Robbie's family after Robbie wanted Wally for his birthday.
 Dana Snyder as Thester Carbomb IV, Fitz's assistant and therapist, first appearing in the season two episode Paradise Found. In season 3 episode Showdown at the O-bese Corral, he became overweight from eating his feelings when he was depressed for looking like Patton Oswalt. He returns in the final season as an assistant to Charles Lovely.
 John Dimaggio as Mrs. Whiskers, an crazy alley cat. She makes a cameo appearance in the first season of Farzar.

Episodes

Season  1 (2018)

Season 2 (2020)

Season 3 (2021)

Season  4: Party Dudes (2022)

Production

Development
On April 4, 2018, Netflix announced that they had given the production a straight-to-series order for a first season consisting of ten episodes. The series was created by Waco O'Guin and Roger Black. Production company and animation studio Bento Box Entertainment was expected to produce the series alongside Odenkirk Provissiero Entertainment. On October 30, 2018, it was announced that Netflix had renewed the series for a second season. The third season was announced in April 2020 and was released on March 12, 2021. The second season features a crossover episode with Brickleberry while making references throughout the latter half of the first season such as Fitz, the only black police officer on Paradise PD, being called Denzel, the only black park ranger on Brickleberry by Kevin, Steve’s doppelgänger. Netflix renewed the show for a fourth and final season which premiered on December 16, 2022.

Casting
Alongside the initial series announcement, it was reported that Dana Snyder, Cedric Yarbrough, David Herman, Tom Kenny, Sarah Chalke, and Kyle Kinane had been cast in series regular roles.

Release
On July 25, 2018, the first trailer for the series was released alongside the announcement that it would premiere on August 31, 2018.

Reception
On Rotten Tomatoes, the first season holds an approval rating of 40% with an average rating of 5.03/10, based on 5 reviews.
In a negative review, The Daily Dots Audra Schroeder gave the series a rating of two-and-a-half stars out of five and criticized the series, describing it as "blunt-force humor without much emotional attachment." In a similarly unfavorable critique, Deciders Joel Keller recommended that viewers skip the series, saying, "If it were just a little bit funnier, we'd recommend it. But it's just not worth sitting through the many unfunny, dirty gags to get to the good stuff." In a more favorable assessment, Konbinis Florian Ques praised the series saying, "The most thrilling aspect of Paradise PD is its natural ability to slip in some real burns aimed at pop culture figures...The humor used to criticize them is very well-executed."

References

External links

2010s American adult animated television series
2010s American animated comedy television series
2010s American police comedy television series
2010s American LGBT-related animated television series
2010s American LGBT-related comedy television series
2020s American LGBT-related comedy television series
2010s American sitcoms
2020s American adult animated television series
2020s American animated comedy television series
2020s American police comedy television series
2020s American sitcoms
2018 American television series debuts
2022 American television series endings
American adult animated comedy television series
American animated sitcoms
English-language Netflix original programming
Television series created by Waco O'Guin and Roger Black
Animated television series by Netflix
Works about Colombian drug cartels